A Cooper vane (also sometimes called a Dan Cooper switch or D.B. Cooper device) is a mechanical aerodynamic wedge that prevents the ventral airstair of an aircraft from being lowered in flight.

History
In the United States, following three hijackings in 1972, the Federal Aviation Administration ordered that Boeing 727 aircraft be fitted with Cooper vanes. The device was named for an unidentified airplane hijacker dubbed D. B. Cooper, who used the rear stairway to exit a Boeing 727 in flight and make a parachute escape.

Design
The Cooper vane is a very simple device: It consists of a spring-loaded paddle connected to a plate that prevents the ventral airstair of an aircraft from being lowered in flight. When the aircraft is on the ramp, the spring keeps the paddle perpendicular to the fuselage, and the attached plate does not block the stairway. As the aircraft takes off, the airflow pushes the paddle parallel to the fuselage and the plate is moved underneath the stairway, preventing it from being lowered. Once the airflow decreases on landing, the spring-loaded paddle returns to its initial position, thereby allowing the stairs to be lowered again. 

McDonnell Douglas DC-9 aircraft with ventral stairs were also equipped with Cooper vanes.

References
 

Aircraft doors
Locks (security device)